Rensselaer is a small city on the east side of the Hudson River in the state of New York. A total of 34 individuals have served as mayor since the city's incorporation in 1897, some serving numerous terms. Michael Stammel (Republican) is the current mayor; he was first elected in 2019 and began service on January 1, 2020. Stammel was re-elected to a four-year term on November 2, 2021.

On April 23, 1897, Governor Frank S. Black granted a law under Chapter 359 creating the municipality that would be known as the City of Rensselaer.

Charles S. Allen served as the first Mayor of the new municipality. The first meeting of the common council of the City of Rensselaer was ordered by Mayor Allen to take place on Tuesday evening April 27, 1897 at 8:30PM.

Mayor Michael E. Stammel

Michael E. Stammel is an American politician serving as the 34th mayor of Rensselaer. He was sworn in on January 1, 2020. He was re-elected on November 2, 2021 to serve a four-year term. Prior to serving as mayor, Stammel served as chairman of the Rensselaer County Legislature.

Career 

Michael Stammel began his career as a politician serving on Rensselaer Common Council in 1994. During his tenure on the Council, Stammel briefly served as council president. After finishing his term, he decided to run for a seat on the Rensselaer County Legislature. In 2019, after the passing of Mayor Daniel Dwyer, Stammel decided to run against Richard Mooney in a special election to finish Dwyer's term. Disagreements between Stammel and members of the Common Council led the Council to consider limiting politicians to only holding one office at a time. At the time, Stammel also served as Chairman of the Rensselaer County Legislature, a dual office position that the council wanted to prevent.

Environmental issues 
Stammel has been vocal about two different environmental issues in Rensselaer: the Dunn Landfill and the proposed BioHiTech waste to energy facility. When the New York State Department of Environmental Conservation blasted the city over their handling of the proposed BioHiTech waste to energy facility, Stammel stepped in. Public comments made by Stammel in August 2020 led to NYS DEC turning down permit requests by Rensselaer Resource Recovery / BioHiTech Global. Under the previous city administration, a land use permit for BioHiTech was greenlighted. Prior to the facility's permits being reviewed by NYS DEC, their land use permits with the City of Rensselaer expired. Due to expired permits, Stammel said the city would require a full environmental review before allowing the project to proceed. The city's original negative declaration for a full environmental review is what led to the state blasting the city.

Dunn Landfill 
During public hearings on the proposed Dunn Landfill in 2012, Stammel and his colleague on the County Legislature, Cristo, submitted a 3-page letter to NYS DEC with their concerns. (Letter dated 2/17/2012 available through FOIL request of NYS DEC)  Concerns highlighted by Stammel and Cristo included: Shredded materials and enforcement, truck traffic, and the proximity to the Rensselaer City School District campus. Stammel has been extremely vocal about the landfill's impacts on the community, stating that the landfill needs to be shut down. While serving on the County Legislature, Stammel sponsored several resolutions calling on the landfill's closure and help from the state Department of Health. Resolutions have also been passed by the City of Rensselaer Common Council and the East Greenbush Town Board.

Emergency services 
Michael Stammel has committed his life to emergency services, serving as a volunteer firefighter and EMT in the City of Rensselaer for many years. When elected Mayor, he vowed to bring a full-time ambulance service in to the city. He also vowed to upgrade equipment and vehicles. Since becoming Mayor, there has been an ongoing dispute between Stammel and the city council over which ambulance service should serve as the provider for the city. The dispute lead to a court case where the judge determined that both sides were wrong. The judge determined that a Request for Proposals must be initiated and the city must interview all interested agencies before making a decision.

Nineteenth century

Twentieth century

Twenty-first century

References 

Source for the names and years: 

Rensselaer, New York